The Ibn Tufayl Foundation for Arabic Studies is a cultural foundation, whose main purpose is to promote and conduct research projects related to the Arabic language, its literature, the history of the Arab World and the history of Al-Andalus.

The Foundation was established on July 7, 2003 and currently has over a hundred fellows and external collaborators of different nationalities in varied academic fields.
The foundation headquarters are located in the city of Almería, Spain.

See also
Biblioteca de al-Andalus

References

External links 
 Fundación Ibn Tufayl de Estudios Árabes -  official site (Spanish)
 Sociedad Española de Estudios Árabes (Spanish Arabic Studies Society)

History of Al-Andalus
Arabic language
2003 establishments in Spain
Almería
Historiography of Spain